Xinjiang County, formerly Jiangzhou, lies in the municipal region of Yuncheng in the southwest of Shanxi province, China.

Situation

The county's area is approximately 600 km2. It is bordered by Wenxi County to the east and Jishan County to the west. Xiangning County to the northwest, Xiangfen County to the northeast, and Houma City to the east are all in Linfen Municipality.

The Fen River, a major tributary of the Yellow, flows westward through the county.

Administration
Xinjiang's population is 320,000 (2002). 
The county executive, legislature, and judiciary are in Longxing Town, together with the CPC and PSB branches.

Climate

Industry
Until recently, its industry was dominated by the production of handicrafts, including lacquerware, embroidery, and leather goods, as well as the manufacture of drugs.

Culture
Xinjiang is known for its folk opera performances.

The county is the home of the Jiangzhou Drum Troupe (also known as Shanxi Jiangzhou Drum Art Ensemble), China's most famous traditional percussion ensemble, which was founded in 1987.

History
Until the Xinhai Revolution, Xinjiang was known as Jiangzhou.

Famous Locals
 The Chan Buddhist monk Yaoshan Weiyan (751–834)   
 The Ming scholar-official and Roman Catholic Thomas Han (Han Lin, 1601–1649)

See also
List of administrative divisions of Shanxi

References

 
County-level divisions of Shanxi